The Mexican unidad de inversión (UDI, ISO 4217 code MXV) is an index unit of funds used in Mexico. It can be traded in many currency markets because its value changes with respect to currencies.  Unlike currencies, it is designed to retain its purchasing power and not be subject to inflation. The Mexican credit system (especially mortgages) uses the UDI rather than the peso because of its stability.

References

Financial markets
Finance in Mexico

de:Mexikanischer_Peso#Mexikanische_Verrechnungseinheit